Hololepta plana is a beetle belonging to the Histeridae family.

References

Histeridae
Beetles described in 1776
Taxa named by Johann Heinrich Sulzer